Mignonne Meekels (born 7 June 1986, Rotterdam) is a Dutch field hockey player, who plays as a defender for Dutch club HC Rotterdam. She also plays for the Netherlands national team and she was part of the Dutch squad that became 2007 Champions Trophy winner.

References
  Profile

1986 births
Living people
Dutch female field hockey players
Sportspeople from Rotterdam
HC Rotterdam players